City Hall is a former Rochester Industrial and Rapid Transit Railway station located in Rochester, New York. It was closed in 1956 along with the rest of the line. 

The station was in the former Erie Canal tunnel under West Broad Street in front of City Hall and the Times Square Building. Beside each building there were covered stairwells to provide access between street level and both ends of the platform.

The Rochester, Lockport and Buffalo Railroad Interurban line used this station as its eastern terminus from the opening of the subway until 1931 when the line became defunct. The Rochester, Syracuse and Eastern used the station as its western terminus. Passengers could transfer between the BL&R, Rochester & Eastern and the subway at this station. 

The Broad Street Tunnel Project rehabilitated this section of the tunnel west of Exchange Boulevard in 2011 and paved the street. The subway tunnel between Main Street and Brown Street was filled in.

References

Railway stations in Rochester, New York
Railway stations in the United States opened in 1918
Railway stations closed in 1956
1918 establishments in New York (state)
1956 disestablishments in New York (state)
Railway stations located underground in New York (state)